Girmachew Tekle Hawaryat (1915–1987) was an Ethiopian poet, who wrote one of the most well-known African novels, Araya (1948–49).

Lifework 
Hawaryat’s most famous work Araya was written in 1948, and encompasses the journeying of a peasant called Araya to Europe.

Araya became a novel that was widely recognized throughout Ethiopia and Africa more broadly. It explores the themes of generational conflict and the superpositions of the differences between the modern and traditional cultures that exist between the two continents.

References 

Ethiopian male writers
1915 births
1987 deaths